General Cho Myong-son (27 November 1923 – 8 July 1994) was a North Korean official. He was a former guerilla fighter.

Career 
Prior to liberation from Japan, he was an anti-Japanese partisan and fought alongside Kim Il-sung, as a messenger. He had enlisted in the Korean Peoples' Revolutionary Army in June 1937. Although he was initially unfamiliar with guerilla warfare and the forests, he adapted to the harsh conditions, and conducted numerous reconnaissance missions against the Japanese, which earned Kim's trust. In 1945, he became a battalion commander, and in August 1950, he became a division commander. It is unknown when he was further promoted.

In With the Century, he was named as a bodyguard who protected Kim during the anti-Japanese warfare and was described as extremely loyal. Due to his loyalty and his command skills, he was promoted to higher positions in the army. He was commended also for responsibly using the army for socialist construction after the Korean War and devoted to strengthening the army.

He was a candidate to the 5th Central Committee of the Workers' Party of Korea and elected to the 5th Supreme People's Assembly in December 1972. In the same year, he received his first Order of Kim Il-sung, followed by another in 1982.

In 1980, he was elected as a full member to the 6th Central Committee of the WPK.

He became the deputy director of the Ministry of Social Security in 1982 and in 1989, the principal of Kang Kon Military Academy.

Death 
Cho Myong-son died on the same day as Kim Il-sung. His death was announced on July  24 and was described as 'unexpected'. He was buried at the Revolutionary Martyrs' Cemetery and a bust of him was erected at his grave. Condolences were delivered from both Kim Il-sung and Kim Jong-il in a funeral in Potonggang-guyok, the last person to receive condolences from Kim Il-sung.

References 

1923 births
1994 deaths
Members of the 5th Supreme People's Assembly
Members of the 6th Central Committee of the Workers' Party of Korea